Blanche Ravalec (born 19 September 1954) is a French actress, dubbing artist, and former stewardess.

Career 
Ravalec is known to English-speaking audiences mainly for her role as Dolly, Jaws' girlfriend in the 1979 James Bond film Moonraker. Beyond this, she has made over 70 appearances in French-language TV and film. Among her English-to-French dubbing work is as "Christina McKinney" (Ashley Jensen) in Ugly Betty, as "Emily Waltham" (Helen Baxendale) in Friends, and as "Bree Van de Kamp" (Marcia Cross) in Desperate Housewives. She also provides voices for the French dub of Thomas the Tank Engine and Friends.

Filmography

Film
 1978: Holiday Hotel – Yveline
 1978: Trocadéro bleu citron
 1978: La Carapate – Marguerite
 1978: Une histoire simple – Maggy (uncredited)
 1979: Moonraker – Dolly (Jaws' girlfriend)
 1982: Le Grand Pardon – Colette
 1982: Salut j'arrive
 1984: Les Voleurs de la nuit – The first woman
 1984: The Blood of Others – Religieuse gare
 1984: À nous les garçons – Daphné
 1985: Suivez mon regard
 1986: Kamikaze (1986) – La speakerine #3 en différé
 1987: Club de rencontres – Marion
 1992: L'Homme de ma vie – Karate Client
 1994: Quand j'avais cinq ans je m'ai tué – La mère de gil
 2000: Scènes de crimes – Madame Bourgoin

Television
 2012: Joséphine, ange gardien TV Series (one episode: "Suivez le guide") – Michelle

References

External links
 
 
 James Bond Multimedia Pages

French film actresses
Living people
French voice actresses
French television actresses
1954 births
Flight attendants